Feodosy Nikolayevich Krasovsky (– October 1, 1948) was a Russian Empire and Soviet astronomer and geodesist. He was born in Galich. In 1900 he graduated from the Mezhevoy (land surveying) Institute in Moscow; in 1907 he began working as a lecturer there.

Research work
At the end of 1928 the Central Research Institute of Geodesy, Aerial Surveying and Cartography (TsNIIGAiK) was founded on his initiative; he worked there as a director (1928–1930) and as a deputy director of science (1930–1937). Between 1924 and 1930 Krasovsky headed astronomical, geodetical and cartographical works in the Soviet Union. He worked out the theory and methods of construction of the national geodetical network of the USSR and solved related problems of topography and gravimetry works. Krasovsky and another Soviet geodesist, Aleksandr Aleksandrovich Izotov, in 1940 defined dimensions of an ellipsoid which was named the Krasovsky ellipsoid and was later used as a reference ellipsoid in the Soviet Union and other countries until the 1990s. In 1939 Krasovsky became the Corresponding Member of the Academy of Sciences of the Soviet Union.

Krasovsky died in Moscow in 1948.

Awards
Stalin Prize (1943, 1952 – posthumously)
Order of Lenin (1945)
Order of the Red Banner of Labour

See also
SK-42 reference system

Citations and notes

References
 Gillispie Coulston, Charles, Dictionary of Scientific Biography, v.7, American Council of Learned Societies, Scribner, 1972
 Farbman, Michael, Europa, Europa publications limited, 1930
 Surveying and Mapping: quarterly publication of American Congress on Surveying and Mapping, v.23, American Congress on Surveying and Mapping, United States Superintendent of Documents, Superintendent of Documents, 1963
 Guelke, Leonard, Cartographica, York University (Toronto, Ont.), Department of Geography, Canadian Cartographic Association, University of Toronto Press, 1971

External links

1878 births
1948 deaths

People from Kostroma Oblast
Corresponding Members of the USSR Academy of Sciences
Astronomers from the Russian Empire
Cartographers from the Russian Empire
Geodesists from the Russian Empire
Stalin Prize winners
Recipients of the Order of Lenin
Recipients of the Order of the Red Banner of Labour
Soviet astronomers
Soviet cartographers
Soviet geodesists
Burials at Vvedenskoye Cemetery